State Road 514 (NM 514) is a  state highway in Los Ojos, New Mexico, United States, that connects New Mexico State Road 112 (NM 112) with U.S. Route 64/U.S. Route 84 (US 64/US 84) in Los Ojos.

Route description

History

Major intersections

See also

 List of state roads in New Mexico

References

External links

514
Transportation in Rio Arriba County, New Mexico